Shui Hua (November 23, 1916 – December 16, 1995), born Zhang Yufan, was a Chinese film director who gained prominence in the 1950s in the early years of the People's Republic of China.

Career
Born in Nanjing in 1916, Shui Hua studied to be an attorney at Fudan University in Shanghai. During the Second Sino-Japanese War, Shui made his way to the Yan'an where he became a member of the Communist Party of China. After the war, Shui became involved in theater while teaching eventually moving into filmmaking with his 1950 debut film, The White Haired Girl. Later in the decade, he directed the critically acclaimed The Lin Family Shop, based on a short story by the author Mao Dun.

With the turmoil of the 1960s and 1970s, Shui's filmmaking days seemed behind him. However, upon China's re-emergence from the Cultural Revolution, Shui again began to direct films, including Regret for the Past (1981), based on a story by Lu Xun, and Blue Flowers (1984).

Filmography

References

External links

Shui Hua at the Chinese Movie Database

1916 births
1995 deaths
Film directors from Jiangsu
Fudan University alumni
Artists from Nanjing

Chinese film directors